The Siloam Springs Cardinals (also known as the Buffaloes,  and the Travelers) was a minor league baseball team that represented Siloam Springs, Arkansas in the Arkansas–Missouri League and Arkansas State League from 1934 to 1940.

Notable alumni
Larry Kennedy (1938)
Ray Powell (1936)
Thurman Tucker (1936) MLB All-Star

References
Baseball Reference

Baseball teams established in 1940
Baseball teams disestablished in 1940
Defunct Arkansas-Missouri League teams
Defunct Arkansas State League teams
Professional baseball teams in Arkansas
St. Louis Cardinals minor league affiliates
1934 establishments in Arkansas
1940 disestablishments in Arkansas
Defunct minor league baseball teams
Defunct baseball teams in Arkansas